"I Will Be There for You" is a debut song recorded by American country music artist Jessica Andrews.  It was released in February 1999 as the first single from the album Heart Shaped World, and was featured on The Prince of Egypt: Nashville soundtrack.  The song reached #28 on the Billboard Hot Country Singles & Tracks chart.  The song was written by Tom Shapiro, Josh Leo and Rick Bowles.

Chart performance

References

1999 debut singles
1999 songs
Jessica Andrews songs
Songs written by Rick Bowles
Songs written by Josh Leo
Songs written by Tom Shapiro
Song recordings produced by Byron Gallimore
DreamWorks Records singles